MTL Arena is an indoor sporting arena that is located in Samara, Russia. The seating capacity of the arena is 1,500. It is the home arena of the Dinamo-Samara Russian professional futsal club.

References

External links
Official site 

Indoor arenas in Russia
Basketball venues in Russia
Sport in Samara, Russia